is an interchange passenger railway station located in the town of Kamigōri, Akō District, Hyōgo Prefecture, Japan, operated jointly by West Japan Railway Company (JR West) and the third-sector semi-public railway operator Chizu Express.

Lines

Station layout
The station consists of two ground-level island platforms connected to the station building by a footbridge. The side of the island platform closest to the station is not used, and one side of the island platform on the opposite side of the station building has a dead-head cutout for use by the Chizu Line. The station is staffed.

Platforms

Adjacent stations

|-
!colspan=5|JR West

|-
!colspan=5|Chizu Express

History
Kamigōri Station opened on April 4, 1895. With the privatization of the Japan National Railways (JNR) on April 1, 1987, the station came under the aegis of the West Japan Railway Company.

Passenger statistics
In fiscal 2019, the JR portion of the station was used by an average of 3001 passengers daily The Chizu Railway portion of the station was used by 498 passengers in fiscal 2017.

Surrounding area
 Kamigōri Town Hall
Hyogo Prefectural Kamigori High School
Kamigori Municipal Kamigori Junior High School
Kamigori Municipal Yamanosato Elementary School

See also
List of railway stations in Japan

References

External links

 JR West Station Official Site
[https://www.chizukyu.co.jp/chizukyu/syaryou_eki/eki/kamigori/ Chizu Express station home page

Railway stations in Hyōgo Prefecture
Sanyō Main Line
Railway stations in Japan opened in 1895
Kamigōri, Hyōgo